Mark Achbar (born in Ottawa in 1955)
is a Canadian filmmaker, best known for The Corporation (2003) and Manufacturing Consent: Noam Chomsky and the Media (1994).

Biography 

Achbar is a graduate of Syracuse University's Fine Arts Film Program. He interned in Hollywood on the children's TV programme Bill Daily's Hocus Pocus Gang, followed by a three-year stint in Toronto with Sunrise Films on their documentary series Spread your Wings and the CBC/Disney series Danger Bay. He then teamed up with director Robert Boyd, and received a Gemini nomination for Best Writer on The Canadian Conspiracy, a cultural/political satire for CBC and HBO's Comedy Experiments hosted by Martin Mull, and featuring Canadian-born stars: Eugene Levy, Lorne Greene, Leslie Nelson, William Shatner, Morley Safer, Howie Mandel, Peter Jennings, John Candy, Dave Thomas, Margot Kidder, and Anne Murray. The fake documentary chronicled Canada’s secret takeover of the United States. The program won a Gemini for Best Entertainment Special and was nominated for an International Emmy.

Achbar moved into independent media, working in many capacities on films, videos, and books. With Peter Wintonick, Achbar co-directed and co-produced Manufacturing Consent: Noam Chomsky and the Media, which was, until the release of The Corporation Canada's all-time, top-grossing feature documentary. Achbar’s companion book to the film hit the national best-seller list in Canada.

Achbar collaborated with Jennifer Abbott to create Two Brides and a Scalpel: Diary of a Lesbian Marriage, a video diary by the couple who became known as Canada's first legally married same-sex couple. This true story of "boy meets girl, boy marries girl, boy becomes girl" received festival invitations from around the world and was broadcast in Canada on Pridevision and the Knowledge Network.

In 1997, Achbar initiated a project titled The Corporation with author and University of British Columbia law professor Joel Bakan. Bakan wrote the film and book, while Achbar co-directed, produced and executive-produced the film, with Jennifer Abbott joining the team as co-director and editor in 2000. The film was released theatrically in 2004 and stands as the all-time, top-grossing feature documentary ever made in Canada. Encore+, a Youtube portal for "classic" Canadian films and TV shows, shows over 8,263,108 views of the film (Sept 15, 2022), which it posted in 2017, its top-ranked title out of 2,500+ titles. Manufacturing Consent is in second place with 7,380,819 views as of Sept 15, 2022—an indication of the importance of the issues the film explores.

Telefilm, a Canadian film and television financing agency, had a generous reward program for producers of successful theatrical films. Until 2004, those films were only dramas. The Corporation changed that. For the first time, a documentary’s box office gross qualified it for a “performance envelope” – a kind of exclusive reserve fund for the top 15% of producers whose films gross over $1m.  A total of $2.38m was awarded to Achbar's company, Invisible Hand Productions Inc, which he put into ten Canadian feature documentaries, five in development and five in production, which helped lock in $270,000 of development financing and a further $5.85m of production financing for those productions. The completed, theatrically-released productions which benefited from this funding are Velcrow Ripper's Fierce Light, When Spirit Meets Action; Denis Delestrac's Pax Americana and the Weaponization of Space, Kevin McMahon's Waterlife, Frederick Gertten's Bananas: Poison in a Banana Republic; Mathieu Roy's and Harold Crooks' Surviving Progress; and Oliver Hockenhull's Neurons to Nirvana: Understanding Psychedelic Medicine.

As an EP, Achbar is advising, and helping, in a small way, to finance four feature documentaries: 
 
Asher Penn is making a film about Gabor Mate, renowned trauma doctor and therapist.
 
Holly McGowan is making Calling All People a film (5 years in progress) about TemPeSt Grace Gale, a 25 year old singer, activist, poet, artist, marionette maker, who was murdered on Hornby Island.
 
Jen Muranetz is making Standing With The Ancients, a film about the standoff happening now between environmental activist protesters and police at Fairy Creek.
 
And Bart Simpson’s (yes that's his real name, and he had it first) film on Mad Magazine founding editor Harvey Kurtzman.

Achbar helped shoot, and is an EP on DOSED2-The Trip Of A Lifetime

Achbar continues his film career as an executive producer of feature documentary films. He has contributed his videography skills to two animal rights videos, Penny's Story and Meat The Victims: Excelsior Farms.

Achbar is co-founder, with Sarah Butterfield, of Speakables, a stealthy Vancouver technology startup which designs novel offline speech-to-text devices to assist the deaf and hard of hearing.

Selected films 
Director and Producer:
 Manufacturing Consent: Noam Chomsky and the Media (with Peter Wintonick) (1992)
 Two Brides And A Scalpel: Diary of a Lesbian Marriage (1999)
 The Corporation (2003)

Executive Producer:

 Blue Gold: World Water Wars, directed by Sam Bozzo  (2008)
 Fierce Light: When Spirit Meets Action, directed by Velcrow Ripper (2008)
 Pax Americana and the Weaponization of Space, directed by Denis Delestrac (2009)
 Waterlife, directed by Kevin McMahon (2009)
 Bananas: Poison in a Banana Republic, directed by Fredrik Gertten (2009)
 Surviving Progress, directed by Mathieu Roy and Harold Crooks (2011)
 Neurons To Nirvana, directed by Oliver Hockenhull (2013)
 Marmato, directed by Mark Grieco (2014)
 Fractured Land, directed by Fiona Rayher and Damien Gillis (2015)
 When the Storm Fades, directed by Sean Devlin (2017)
 Physician Heal Thyself: The Life and Work of Dr. Gabor Mate, directed by Asher Penn (in progress)
 Calling All People, directed by Hollie McGowan (in progress)
 Standing with the Ancients - a film about Fairy Creek, directed by Jen Muranetz (in progress)
 Kurtzman, on the writer and editor of the comic book Mad, directed and produced by Bart Simpson (in progress)

Script Consultant:
Truth to the Powerless, directed by Pitasanna Shanmugathas and Ryan Ellis (2022)

 Awards 
 Gemini Award nomination, Best Writer, The Canadian Conspiracy — "a cultural/political satire for CBC and HBO's Comedy Experiments."

Awards for The Corporation
Audience Award, World Cinema, Documentary Sundance Film Festival
Audience Award Philadelphia International Film Festival
Audience Award Vancouver International Film Festival
Audience Award Thessaloniki Documentary Film Festival
Audience Award FIC Brasília International Film Festival
Audience Award (1st runner-up) Calgary International Film Festival
Audience Award (1st runner-up) Toronto International Film Festival
Insight Award for Excellence National Association of Film and Digital Media Artists, US
Best Documentary The Genie Awards, 2005
Genesis Award for Outstanding Documentary Film United States Humane Society
Audience Award for Best Feature Length Film Ecocinema International Film Festival, Rhodes
Best Feature Documentary Environmental Media Association Awards
Reel Room Audience Award for Best Documentary Sydney Film Festival
Joris Ivens Special Jury Award International Documentary Festival, Amsterdam
NFB Best Documentary Award Calgary International Film Festival
Best Feature Length Documentary Ecocinema International Film Festival, Rhodes
Top Ten Films of the Year Toronto International Film Festival Group
Best Documentary Program or Series - History/Biography/Social/Political Leo Award
Best Direction in a Documentary Program or Series Leo Award
Best Screenwriting in a Documentary Program or Series Leo Award
Best Picture Editing in a Documentary Program or Series Leo Award
Best Overall Sound in a Documentary Program or Series Leo Award
Best Sound Editing in a Documentary Program or Series Leo Award
Best Documentary (1st runner-up) Seattle International Film Festival
Special Jury Mention Montreal New Film And Video Festival

Awards for Manufacturing Consent
Golden Sesterce (Grand Prize) 1992 Visions du Réel documentary film festival, Nyon, Switzerland
Special Mention, FIPRESCI International Press Jury 1992 Visions du Réel documentary film festival, Nyon, Switzerland
Special Mention, Public Jury 1992 Nyon International Documentary Film Festival
Federal Express Award for Most Popular Canadian Film  1992 Vancouver International Film Festival
Gold Hugo (Best Social/Political Documentary) 1992 Chicago International Film Festival
Special Mention, Unanimous Jury Award 1992 Toronto International Festival of Festivals
Special Jury Award 1992 Atlantic Film Festival
Public's "Most Loved" Documentary 1992 Sydney International Film Festival
Gold Apple 1993 National Educational Film and Video Festival
Honourable Mention 1993 American Film and Video Festival
Director's Choice Award 1993 Charlotte Film and Video Festival
 Voted "Best of the Festival" by Public  1993 Edmonton Global Visions Film Festival
Gold Conch (Grand Prize ex-aqueo) 1994 Bombay International Documentary Film Festival
Critics' Award 1994 Bombay International Film Festival
Grand Prize- Best Political Documentary 1994 Canadian Documentary Film Festival
Prix de la Critique Internationale/FIPRESCI Fédération Internationale de la Presse Cinématographique Festival de NYONEDistinguished Documentary Achievement  1994  International Documentary Association

Nominations or semi-finalistYamagata International Documentary Film FestivalInternational Documentary Association AwardsBlois International Film FestivalQuinzaine du cinéma québécoisThe Orwell AwardBest Documentary of the Year - New Internationalist Magazine'''

References

 External links 

"The Beast with No Name: Mark Achbar and Joel Bakan with Williams Cole" The Brooklyn Rail'' (Summer 2004)

Film directors from Ontario
Canadian documentary film directors
Syracuse University College of Visual and Performing Arts alumni
Living people
Directors of Genie and Canadian Screen Award winners for Best Documentary Film
1955 births
Sundance Film Festival award winners